Valentina Ivanova Kaneva, best known as Valya (Валя) (born 23 April 1978), is a Bulgarian pop-folk singer. Valya was born in Haskovo.

Albums
2001–"I want everything"
2002–"My World"
2005–"Something Intimate"

Awards
2000– Trakia Folk Award for "Best Debut"
2002– Annual awards of the magazine "New Folk"- Award for "Best Debut"
2003– Trakia Folk- "Best Song Arrangement"- for the album "What do you see in Me"
2005– Pirin Folk- First Prize for "Best Song"- "New Spring"
2008– University Troubadours "Audience Award"

Concerts Abroad
USA

Hits
"100 Calls"
"100 Bouquet"
"I will burn"
"Mirror"
"You are the past for Me"
"Sea Wall"
"I, not I"
"Let's Dance"
"Good Night"
"Lonely Body"
"Boring"
"Mood"
"Something Intimate"
"My Destiny"

References

External links
 

1978 births
Living people
21st-century Bulgarian women singers
Bulgarian folk-pop singers
Payner artists
People from Haskovo